Insect collecting refers to the collection of insects and other arthropods for scientific study or as a hobby. Most insects are small and the majority cannot be identified without the examination of minute morphological characters, so entomologists often make and maintain insect collections. Very large collections are conserved in natural history museums or universities where they are maintained and studied by specialists. Many college courses require students to form small collections. There are also amateur entomologists and collectors who keep collections.

Historically, insect collecting has been widespread and was in the Victorian age a very popular educational hobby. Insect collecting has left traces in European cultural history, literature and songs (e.g., Georges Brassens's La chasse aux papillons (The Hunt for Butterflies)). The practice is particularly common among Japanese youths.

Capture and kill techniques

Insects may be passively caught using traps such as funnels, pitfall traps, bottle traps, malaise traps, or flight interception traps, some of which are baited with small bits of sweet foods (such as honey). Entomologists collecting nocturnal insects (especially moths) during faunistic survey studies might utilize ultraviolet light traps such as the Robinson trap. Aspirators, sometimes called "pooters", suck up insects too small or delicate to handle with fingers.

Active capture of insects often involves using nets. Aerial insect nets are used to collect flying insects. The bag of a butterfly net is generally constructed from a lightweight mesh to minimize damage to delicate butterfly wings. Sweep nets are more rugged, and used to collect insects from grass and brush. A sweep net is swept back and forth through vegetation quickly turning the opening from side to side and following a shallow figure eight pattern. The collector walks forward while sweeping, and the net is moved through plants and grasses with force. Sweeping continues for some distance and then the net is flipped over, with the bag hanging over the rim, trapping the insects until they can be removed. Other types of nets used for collecting insects include beating nets and aquatic nets. Leaf litter sieves are used by coleopterists and to collect larvae.

Once collected, a insects must be killed before they damage themselves trying to escape. Killing jars are used on hard-bodied insects.  Soft-bodied insects, such as those in the larval stage, are generally fixed in a vial containing an ethanol and water solution.

Storage and curation
 
There are several different preservation methods that are used; some of which include: dried preservation (pinning), liquid preservation, or slide mounts. Another (now mostly historical) approach is caterpillar inflation, where the innards were removed and the skin dried. Pinning is by far the most common form of insect preservation. 

It is better to pin an insect that has died recently enough that it has not dried yet, because it allows the thoracic muscles to adhere to the pin. Previously dried specimens must have glue applied to the pin location to avoid spinning. The large majority of the time insects are pinned vertically through their mesothorax and slightly off-center to the right of the mid-line. The pin should sit with 1/4 of the pin above the insect as to allow enough room for labels to be readable underneath. 

When pinning insects with wings, it is important to display them properly: Lepidoptera wings should always be spread. When drying insects with wings such as butterflies, setting paper is used to position the wings.

Orthopteroids often have their left wings spread. In scientific collections, the insect's wings, legs, and antenna are tucked underneath it to conserve space.   

When pin-mounting small insects the insect is glued to a piece of non acidic, triangle paper. This is called pointing. When drying an insect the relaxed insect is spread out accordingly using pins on a foam block where it can dry and retain its positioning. 

When labeling insects the labels are presented in this order top down: Locality, additional locality/voucher label/accession numbers, insect identification.

Insect pins 

Insect pins are used by entomologists for mounting collected insects.
They can also be used in dressmaking for very fine silk or antique fabrics.

They were once commonly made from brass or silver, but these would corrode from contact with insect bodies and are no longer commonly used.
Instead they are nickel-plated brass, yielding "white" or "black" enamelling, or even made from stainless steel.
Similarly, the smallest sizes from 000 to 1 used to be impractical for mounting until plastic and polyethylene became commonly used for pinning bases.

minutens are headless micropins that are generally only made of stainless steel, used for double-mounting, where the insect is mounted on the minuten, which is pinned to a small block of soft material, which is in turn mounted on a standard, larger, insect pin.

Pinning of entomological specimens

Entomological pins. Continental pins, so called for historical reasons, are used internationally by museums and collectors. They are made of stainless steel for preference, especially for very long-term storage of specimens, but blackened steel also is used. The pins have round plastic or solid metal heads. Continental pins are of a standard length (40mm), but they are available in thicknesses numbered 000 (the thinnest), 00, 0, 1, 2, 3, 4, 5, and 6 (the thickest). This standard pin length is sufficient to accommodate an adequate number of data labels and to permit convenient handling with suitably curved forceps or tweezers, referred to as 'entomological forceps'.

As an exception to this standard, there also are pins of size 7, extra-long and very strong pins for very large beetles; they are 52mm long and thicker than size 6 pins. 
Direct pinning. Direct pinning is the insertion of an entomological pin directly through the thorax of a specimen. The insects are pinned vertically through the thorax with a suitably sized pin, but by convention they are not pinned on the midline, but to the right, so as to leave at least one side undamaged.
Point. A point is a triangular piece of white card. Specially designed point punches permit the production of large numbers of points of standard sizes as required. To use a point, insert a pin is inserted through the broad base of the triangle. To mount the specimen, a tiny amount of glue is placed on the tip and applied to the right side of the insect's thorax. If appropriate the tip of the point may be bent at the necessary angle to hold the body of the specimen horizontal when the pin is vertical, with the long axis of the insect at right angles to the point.

Minuten pins. Insect pins without heads, 12mm long. They are used for double mounting (staging) very small insects. They also may be used profitably for staging insects of moderate size, where they have the advantage of being less damaging to the specimen. For best effect in that respect, the pin is inserted from below through the staging card, well into the thorax, but not all the way through. Alternatively the minuten pin can be inserted laterally into one side of the thorax, again preferably not all the way through.

Carding. Insects (especially Coleoptera and Hemiptera) are glued to rectangular pieces of acid free card or Bristol board providing a stage. Typical sizes are 4.5 x 11 mm;5 x 14 mm;6 x 17 mm;10 x 21 mm;13 x 30 mm. Printed lines allow uniform placement of the entomological pin. Though this is convenient, it is dubious practice at best, because it obscures features that might be necessary for taxonomic or morphological studies. In any case, at the very least the glue should be sufficiently conveniently soluble to be removed with solvents when necessary. With such considerations in mind, Canada balsam is about as good an adhesive as any. 

Staging. When specimens are mounted on a smaller support which in turn is supported on a normal full-sized entomological pin, this is called staging. For example a specimen might be mounted on a minuten pin, typically being pinned on its side (lateral pinning) or upright (direct pinning) with the minuten pin driven into a stage, a strip of suitable material such as dried plant pith or plastic foam supported in a horizontal position on the main entomological pin; as a rule a number 3 pin is convenient. Other forms of stage include card mounts and point mounts. 
The stage usually is positioned at such a distance up the vertical stage-pin, as to put the specimen at the same height as a directly pinned insect; this normally allows room for labels beneath and to allow handling of the specimen without damage. 
If insects are side-pinned by pins that pass right through the specimens, then the minuten should be at such an angle that different features are damaged on the opposite sides of the thorax. Competent staging protects small specimens and displays most features conveniently. The stage-pin then is easy to manipulate when moving the specimen and the stage absorbs vibrations.

In popular culture

Pokémon creator Satoshi Tajiri's childhood hobby of insect collecting is the inspiration behind the popular video game series.

A beetle collection becomes a source of fascination for a mentally disturbed woman in Chapter XI of MacKinlay Kantor's Pulitzer Prize-winning novel Andersonville (1955).

See also
Identification key
Killing jar
Timeline of entomology

References

Further reading
Picture Guide series For college students. Out of date but very useful for beginners.
Harry Edwin Jaques, 1941 How to know the insects; an illustrated key to the more common families of insects, with suggestions for collecting, mounting and studying them. His Pictured-key nature series Mt. Pleasant, Ia.,The author Full text online here Excellent college level guide
Hongfu, Zhu, 1949 How to know the immature insects; an illustrated key for identifying the orders and families of many of the immature insects with suggestions for collecting, rearing and studying them, by H. F. Chu. Pictured key nature series Dubuque, Iowa,W. C. Brown Co.Full text online here

External links 

Capture methods and techniques Intermediate level
 Collecting and Preserving Insects and Mites: Tools and Techniques; PDF Comprehensive, detailed download. Advanced level.
How to make an insect collection; containing suggestions and hints designed to aid the beginning and less advanced collector (Wards Natural Science Establishment 1945)

Collecting
Collecting
Natural history
Cultural history